Ameny may refer to:

 An Egyptian pharaoh foretold in the Prophecy of Neferti, generally thought to be a short form of Amenemhat I of the 12th dynasty
 Amenemhat (BH2), Egyptian 12th dynasty nomarch
 Ameny (general), Egyptian 12th dynasty general
 Ameny (high steward), Egyptian 13th dynasty high steward
 Ameny (vizier), Egyptian 12th dynasty vizier
 Ameny Antef, Egyptian 13th dynasty pharaoh, full name Seankhibre Ameny Antef Amenemhet VI
 Ameny Qemau, Egyptian 13th dynasty pharaoh

Ancient Egyptian given names
Theophoric names